Shirazi-ye Vosta (also Romanized as Shīrāzī-ye Vosţá; also known as Shīrāzī-ye Babrī) is a village in Qarah Su Rural District, in the Central District of Kermanshah County, Kermanshah Province, Iran. At the 2006 census, its population was 24, in 4 families.

References 

Populated places in Kermanshah County